Anilios obtusifrons, also known as the blunt-snouted blind snake, is a species of blind snake that is endemic to Australia. The specific epithet obtusifrons (“blunt-snouted”) refers to the snake's appearance.

Description
The snake grows to about 22.5 cm in length. It is moderately long, slender and unpigmented.

Behaviour
The species is oviparous.

Distribution
The species occurs in the Geraldton Sandplains bioregion of Western Australia. The habitat is typically Acacia woodland or shrubland with scattered mallee on brown loam soils. The type locality is 23 km south of the town of Kalbarri.

References

 
obtusifrons
Snakes of Australia
Reptiles of Western Australia
Reptiles described in 2017
Taxa named by Ryan J. Ellis